In mathematics, and specifically partial differential equations, d´Alembert's formula is the general solution to the one-dimensional wave equation: 

for 

It is named after the mathematician Jean le Rond d'Alembert, who derived it in 1747 as a solution to the problem of a vibrating string.

Details
Back in  coordinates,

This solution  can be interpreted as two waves with constant velocity  moving in opposite directions along the x-axis.

Now consider this solution with the Cauchy data .

Using  we get .

Using  we get .

We can integrate the last equation to get 

Now we can solve this system of equations to get

Now, using 

d'Alembert's formula becomes:

Generalization for inhomogeneous canonical hyperbolic differential equations 
The general form of an inhomogeneous canonical hyperbolic type differential equation takes the form of:

All second order differential equations with constant coefficients can be transformed into their respective canonic forms. This equation is one of these three cases: Elliptic partial differential equation, Parabolic partial differential equation and Hyperbolic partial differential equation.

The only difference between a homogeneous and an inhomogeneous (partial) differential equation is that in the homogeneous form we only allow 0 to stand on the right side, while the inhomogeneous one is much more general, as in  could be any function as long as it's continuous and can be continuously differentiated twice.

The solution of the above equation is given by the formula:

If , the first part disappears, if , the second part disappears, and if , the third part disappears from the solution, since integrating the 0-function between any two bounds always results in 0.

See also
D'Alembert operator
Mechanical wave
Wave equation

Notes

External links
An example of solving a nonhomogeneous wave equation from www.exampleproblems.com

Partial differential equations
https://www.knowledgeablegroup.com/2020/09/equations%20change%20world.html